Endothelin-3 is a protein that in humans is encoded by the EDN3 gene.

The protein encoded by this gene is a member of the endothelin family. Endothelins are endothelium-derived vasoactive peptides involved in a variety of biological functions. The active form of this protein is a 21 amino acid peptide processed from the precursor protein. The active peptide is a ligand for endothelin receptor type B (EDNRB). The interaction of this endothelin with EDNRB is essential for development of neural crest-derived cell lineages, such as melanocytes and enteric neurons. Mutations in this gene and EDNRB have been associated with Hirschsprung disease (HSCR) and Waardenburg syndrome (WS), which are congenital disorders involving neural crest-derived cells. Four alternatively spliced transcript variants encoding three distinct isoforms have been observed.

References

Further reading

Endothelin receptor agonists